Horner Ballpark is a baseball field in Dallas, Texas.  It is the home park of the Dallas Baptist Patriots baseball team of the NCAA Division I Missouri Valley Conference.  It opened on February 15, 2013, and has been highly acclaimed by national media, including D1Baseball.com.

The stadium is named for Joan and Andy Horner, who made the lead donation for the park. The Patriots hosted the Dallas Regional in 2015 at Horner Ballpark.

The ballpark succeeded Patriot Field as the home of Dallas Baptist baseball team.

Horner Ballpark received a new scoreboard manufactured by Daktronics prior to the start of the 2018 season.

Horner Ballpark hosted the 2018 Missouri Valley Conference baseball tournament, with Missouri State defeating the Patriots 7–6 in the championship game.

See also
 List of NCAA Division I baseball venues

References

College baseball venues in the United States
Baseball venues in Texas
Dallas Baptist Patriots baseball